Maurizio Prato (born 18 May 1941, in Foligno) is an Italian businessman. He is currently president of Fintecna.

He was chief executive of the Italian airline Alitalia. He resigned after the merger deal with Air France - KLM collapsed in April 2008. then an official at the Istituto Poligrafico e Zecca dello Stato.

References

External links

People from Foligno
Living people
Italian businesspeople
1941 births